High Road is the eleventh studio album by American hard rock band Night Ranger, released on June 10, 2014. It peaked at No. 105 on the Billboard 200 albums chart, No. 31 on the Billboard Top Rock Albums chart, and No. 9 on the Billboard Hard Rock Albums chart, all on June 28, 2014.

Track listing
"High Road" (Colin Blades, Jack Blades, Brad Gillis, Kelly Keagy) - 3:54
"Knock Knock Never Stop" (Jack Blades, Brad Gillis, Kelly Keagy) - 3:41
"Rollin' On" (Jack Blades, Brad Gillis, Kelly Keagy) - 4:44
"Don't Live Here Anymore" (Jack Blades, Brad Gillis, Kelly Keagy, Eric Levy) - 5:39
"I'm Coming Home" (Jack Blades, Brad Gillis, Joel Hoekstra, Kelly Keagy) - 4:50
"X Generation" (Jack Blades, Brad Gillis, Kelly Keagy) - 4:56
"Only for You Only" (Jack Blades, Brad Gillis, Kelly Keagy, Eric Levy) - 4:38
"Hang On" (Jack Blades, Brad Gillis, Kelly Keagy) - 5:38
"St. Bartholomew" (Jack Blades, Brad Gillis, Kelly Keagy) - 4:26
"Brothers" (Jack Blades, Brad Gillis, Kelly Keagy, Eric Levy) - 4:30
"L.A. No Name" (instrumental) (Jack Blades, Joel Hoekstra) - 4:26

Personnel
Jack Blades - bass, vocals
Kelly Keagy - drums, vocals
Brad Gillis - guitars, vocals
Joel Hoekstra - guitars
Eric Levy - keyboards

References

2014 albums
Night Ranger albums
Frontiers Records albums